Lindmania atrorosea is a plant species in the genus Lindmania. This species is endemic to Venezuela.

References

atrorosea
Flora of Venezuela